Saboréalo (Taste It) is the fifth album by Elvis Crespo. It was re-released the following year as Hora Enamorada.

Track listing
 "Hora Enamorada"
 "7 Días"
 "Dónde Estarás"
 "Veranéame"
 "Gózame"
 "Pégate"
 "Toca"
 "No Sé Qué Pasó"
 "Soleo"
 "Como Yo"
 "Regálame"
 "Pan Comio'"
 "Outro"

Special Edition / Hora Enamorada
 "Hora Enamorada"
 "7 Días"
 "Dónde Estarás"
 "Veranéame"
 "Gózame"
 "Pégate"
 "Toca"
 "No Sé Qué Pasó"
 "Soleo"
 "Como Yo"
 "Regálame"
 "Pan Comio"
 "Viva la Navidad"
 "Una Copa"
 "El Lamento del Libertario"
 "Hora Enamorada [Club Mix]"
 "Hora Enamorada [Reggaeton Mix]"
 "Outro"

2017 Version

 "Hora Enamorada"
 "7 Días"
 "Dónde Estarás"
 "Veranéame"
 "Pégate"
 "Toca"
 "No Sé Qué Pasó"
 "Soleo"
 "Como Yo"
 "Regálame"
 "Pan Comio'"
 "Mambo Guayaquil"

See also
List of number-one Billboard Tropical Albums from the 2000s

References 

Elvis Crespo albums
2004 albums
Latin Grammy Award for Best Merengue/Bachata Album